The Junkers Profly Ultima is a German aerobatic homebuilt aircraft that was designed by Andre Konig and produced by Junkers Profly of Kodnitz, introduced in 1993. When it was available the aircraft was supplied as a kit for amateur construction.

By January 2014 the aircraft was no longer offered by the company.

Design and development
The Ultima features a cantilever low-wing, a two-seats-in-side-by-side configuration enclosed cockpit under a bubble canopy, fixed tricycle landing gear with wheel pants and a single engine in tractor configuration.

For its aerobatic role the Ultima is stressed to +6 and -4 g.

With full fuel of  the payload for pilot, passenger and baggage is just .

The manufacturer estimated the construction time from the supplied kit as 400 hours.

Specifications (Ultima)

See also
List of aerobatic aircraft

References

Ultima
1990s German sport aircraft
1990s German civil utility aircraft
Single-engined tractor aircraft
Low-wing aircraft
Homebuilt aircraft
Aerobatic aircraft
Aircraft first flown in 1993